Brian Kenneth Abshire (born November 14, 1963) is a retired long-distance runner from the United States (Richmond, California), who competed for the U.S. at the 1988 Summer Olympics in the men's 3,000 meter steeplechase. He won the bronze medal in the same event at the 1987 Pan American Games, behind Brazil's Adauto Domingues (gold) and countryman Henry Marsh (silver).

He started college in Oregon at Clackamas Community College, but then transferred to Auburn University where he was twice an All-American in cross-country, an All-American indoors in the 3,000 metres, and a two-time All-American in the steeplechase.

Abshire was a member of Athletics West.

Notes

References

1963 births
Living people
American male long-distance runners
American male steeplechase runners
Athletes (track and field) at the 1987 Pan American Games
Athletes (track and field) at the 1988 Summer Olympics
Olympic track and field athletes of the United States
Sportspeople from Richmond, California
Track and field athletes from California
Pan American Games medalists in athletics (track and field)
Pan American Games bronze medalists for the United States
Medalists at the 1987 Pan American Games